Groomsville may refer to:

Groomsville, Indiana, an unincorporated community in Tipton County
Groomsville, Queensland, a locality in Australia